Ijrud may refer to:
 Ijrud County
 Ijrud-e Bala Rural District
 Ijrud-e Pain Rural District